Tramp stamps may refer to:

 A sexist nickname for lower-back tattoos
 Tramp Stamps (band), formed in 2020 in Nashville, Tennessee
 Tramp Stamps and Birthmarks, 2012 album by Logan Lynn